Indotyphlus is a small genus of caecilians in the family Grandisoniidae. As caecilians in general, they superficially resemble earthworms. The genus is endemic to the Western Ghats, India. They are sometimes known as Battersby's caecilians.

Description
The eyes are visible in sockets, instead of under bone. Other diagnostic characters are absence of temporal fossae, mesethmoid not being exposed dorsally, presence of splenial teeth, secondary grooves, and scales, tentacular opening that is closer to the eye than to the external nostril, no unsegmented terminal shield, smallish narial plugs on tongue, absence of diastema between vomerine and palatine teeth, and absence of terminal keel.

Development is probably direct, without aquatic larvae.

Habitat
The genus is unusual among caecilians in that both species have been recorded from relatively open, shallow-soiled areas with long dry season.

Species
The genus contains two species:

References

Indotyphlidae
Amphibian genera
Amphibians of Asia
Endemic fauna of the Western Ghats
Taxa named by Edward Harrison Taylor